The 2012 Meath Senior Football Championship is the 120th edition of the Meath GAA's premier club Gaelic football tournament for senior graded teams in County Meath, Ireland. The tournament consists of 17 teams, with the winner going on to represent Meath in the Leinster Senior Club Football Championship. The championship starts with a group stage and then progresses to a knock out stage.

Summerhill were the defending champions after they defeated Dunshaughlin in the previous years final.

Moynalvey were promoted after claiming the 2011 Meath Intermediate Football Championship title, their first year in the senior grade since being relegated in 2000 and only their 2nd ever period as a senior club.

The draw for the group stages of the championship was made at Áras Tailteann on 13 February 2012, with the games commencing on the weekend of 15 April 2012.

On 28 October 2012, Navan O'Mahonys claimed their 18th senior championship title when they defeated Wolfe Tones 1-11 to 0-7. Shane Gillespie was named as Man-of-the-Match and captain Marcus Brennan raised the Keegan Cup for O'Mahonys.

Team changes
The following teams have changed division since the 2011 championship season.

To S.F.C.
Promoted from I.F.C.
 Moynalvey  -  (Intermediate Champions)

From S.F.C.
Relegated to I.F.C.
 Trim

Participating teams
The teams taking part in the 2012 Meath Senior Football Championship are:

Senior Championship Proposals
During the winter of 2011/2012 proposals to change the structure of the Senior Football Championship by increasing the number of teams from 17 to 18 were passed, so that teams will have no byes during the group phase. In the 2012 Senior championship, there will be two groups of 6 teams and one group of 5 teams, however there will be no relegation from the Senior championship at the end of the season and the Intermediate championship winners will be promoted leaving the number of teams at 18 for the 2013 campaign.

Group stage
There are 3 groups called Group A,B and C. The 3 top finishers in Group A and B and the top 2 finishers in Group C will qualify for the quarter finals. The draw for the group stages of the championship were made on 13 February 2012.

Group A

Round 1:
 Nobber 0-9, 0-9 Duleek/Bellewstown, Simonstown, 13/4/2012,
 St Patricks 1-7, 2-17 Summerhill, Pairc Tailteann, 15/4/2012,
 Donaghmore/Ashbourne 1-16, 0-16 Moynalvey, Skryne, 20/4/2012,

Round 2:
 Summerhill 1-7, 2-11 Donaghmore/Ashbourne, Dunshaughlin, 27/4/2012,
 Nobber 0-10, 2-8 Moynalvey, Walterstown, 27/4/2012,
 Duleek/Bellewstown 0-4, 0-6 St Patricks, Ashbourne, 28/4/2012,

Round 3:
 Duleek/Bellewstown 0-7, 0-15 Donaghmore/Ashbourne, Stamullen, 10/8/2012,
 St Patricks 1-13, 1-8 Nobber, Bohermeen, 11/8/2012,
 Summerhill 1-20, 1-11 Moynalvey, Dunsany, 12/8/2012,

Round 4:
 Donaghmore/Ashbourne 0-9, 2-10 St Patricks, Seneschalstown, 1/9/2012,
 Moynalvey 0-14, 2-8 Duleek/Bellewstown, Ratoath, 2/9/2012,
 Nobber 0-7, 5-14 Summerhill, Walterstown, 2/9/2012,

Round 5:
 Nobber 1-10, 2-15 Donaghmore/Ashbourne, Rathkenny, 8/9/2012,
 St Patricks 6-7, 3-8 Moynalvey, Dunshaughlin, 8/9/2012,
 Duleek/Bellewstown 0-14, 1-12 Summerhill, Pairc Tailteann, 8/9/2012.

Group B

Round 1:
 St Peters Dunboyne 3-12, 0-8 Dunshaughlin, Ashbourne, 12/4/2012,
 Skryne 0-8, 1-9 Simonstown Gaels, Pairc Tailteann, 15/4/2012,
 Wolfe Tones 0-12, 0-8 Walterstown, Rathkenny, 15/4/2012,

Round 2:
 Dunshaughlin 0-9, 1-6 Skryne, Ratoath, 28/4/2012,
 Walterstown 0-6, 0-9 St. Peters Dunboyne, Trim, 28/4/2012,
 Simonstown Gaels 3-5, 2-11 Wolfe Tones, Seneschalstown, 29/4/2012,

Round 3:
 Wolfe Tones 0-14, 0-10 Skryne, Trim, 11/8/2012,
 Simonstown Gaels 0-10, 0-10 St Peters Dunboyne, Pairc Tailteann, 12/8/2012,
 Walterstown 1-11, 0-10 Dunshaughlin, Pairc Tailteann, 12/8/2012,

Round 4:
 Dunshaughlin 0-17, 2-19 Simonstown Gaels, Skryne, 1/9/2012,
 St Paters Dunboyne 0-11, 0-11 Wolfe Tones, Brews Hill, 1/9/2012,
 Skryne 0-10, 0-10 Walterstown, Dunshaughlin, 2/9/2012,

Round 5:
 Simonstown Gaels 2-12, 1-7 Walterstown, Brews Hill, 9/9/2012,
 Wolfe Tones 2-13, 1-14 Dunshaughlin, Bective, 9/9/2012,
 Skryne 3-7, 1-10 St Peters Dunboyne, Ashbourne, 9/9/2012.

Group C

Round 1:
 Oldcastle 0-4, 1-15 Navan O'Mahonys, Kells, 14/4/2012,
 Blackhall Gaels 1-7, 1-10 Seneschalstown, Dunsany, 21/4/2012,
 Rathkenny  -  Bye,

Round 2:
 Oldcastle 0-6, 2-5 Blackhall Gaels, Brews Hill, 27/4/2012,
 Rathkenny 0-5, 1-11 Navan O'Mahonys, Kilberry, 29/4/2012,
 Seneschalstown  -  Bye,

Round 3:
 Seneschalstown 0-11, 0-7 Oldcastle, Kilmainham, 11/8/2012,
 Blackhall Gaels 1-9, 1-3 Rathkenny, Ashbourne, 12/8/2012,
 Navan O'Mahonys  -  Bye,

Round 4:
 Navan O'Mahonys 1-17 0-3 Blackhall Gaels, Pairc Tailteann, 2/9/2012,
 Rathkenny 0-12, 0-17 Seneschalstown, Kilberry, 2/9/2012,
 Oldcastle  -  Bye,

Round 5:
 Oldcastle 1-13, 1-8 Rathkenny, Kilmainahmwood, 7/9/2012,
 Seneschalstown 1-6, 0-11 Navan O'Mahonys, Pairc Tailteann, 8/9/2012,
 Blackhall Gaels  -  Bye,

Finals

Quarter-finals
 Navan O'Mahonys 1-14, 0-9 Simonstown Gaels, Pairc Tailteann, 29/9/2012,
 Summerhill 0-10, 2-8 Seneschalstown, Skryne, 29/9/2012,
 Donaghmore/Ashbourne 0-17, 0-8 St. Peters Dunboyne, Pairc Tailteann, 29/9/2012 
 St. Patricks 0-6, 0-11 Wolfe Tones, Ashbourne, 30/9/2012,

Semi-finals
 Navan O'Mahonys 0-10, 0-9 Donaghmore/Ashbourne, Pairc Tailteann, 14/10/2012 
 Wolfe Tones 1-13, 0-11 Seneschalstown, Pairc Tailteann, 14/10/2012 

Final
 Navan O'Mahonys 1-11, 0-7 Wolfe Tones, Pairc Tailteann, 28/10/2012

References

External links

Meath Senior Football Championship
Meath Senior Football Championship